Ha Il-kwon (born January 10, 1982) is a South Korean manhwaga. He graduated from Sejong-University in Korea.  He majored in Cartoon-Animation. His most notable works include Annarasumanara, God of Bath, Duty After School and Taste of Illness.

Bibliography

Adaptations

Screen 
 The Sound of Magic (Annarasumanara) 안나라수마나라 
 Duty After School 방과 후 전쟁활동

Stage 
 Sambong Barber Shop 삼봉이발소, 2008 
 Annarasumanara 안나라수마나라, 2014

References

External links 
 official blog

1982 births
Living people
South Korean manhwa artists
South Korean webtoon creators
People from Seoul
Sejong University alumni